There were twelve national teams competing in the women's Olympic field hockey tournament at the 2016 Summer Olympics in Rio de Janeiro. Sixteen players were officially enrolled in each squad. Two reserve players could also be nominated to be available should a player enrolled in the official squad become injured during the tournament.

Pool A

China
The following is the China roster in the women's field hockey tournament of the 2016 Summer Olympics.

Head coach: Cho Myung-jun

Li Dongxiao (GK)
Wang Mengyu
Li Jiaqi
De Jiaojiao
Cui Qiuxia (C)
Yu Qian
Peng Yang
Liang Meiyu
Wang Na
Zhang Jinrong
Ou Zixia
Li Hongxia
Wu Qiong
Zhang Xiaoxue
Sun Xiao
Zhao Yudiao
Song Qingling

Reserves:
 Guo Jiajia (GK)

Germany
The following is the German roster in the women's field hockey tournament of the 2016 Summer Olympics. Annika Sprink was replaced due to an injury by Katharina Otte on 18 August 2016.

Head coach: Jamilon Mülders

Nike Lorenz
Selin Oruz
Anne Schröder
Lisa Schütze
Charlotte Stapenhorst
Katharina Otte
Janne Müller-Wieland
Hannah Krüger
Jana Teschke
Lisa Hahn
Franzisca Hauke
Cécile Pieper
Marie Mävers
Annika Sprink
Julia Müller
Pia-Sophie Oldhafer
Kristina Reynolds (GK)

Reserves
 Yvonne Frank (GK)

Netherlands
The following is the Netherlands roster in the women's field hockey tournament of the 2016 Summer Olympics.

Head coach: Alyson Annan

New Zealand
The following is the New Zealand roster in the women's field hockey tournament of the 2016 Summer Olympics.

Head coach: Mark Hager

South Korea
The following is the South Korea roster in the women's field hockey tournament of the 2016 Summer Olympics.

Head coach: Han Jin-soo

Jang Soo-ji (GK)
Seo Jung-eun
Park Seung-a
An Hyo-ju
<li value=9>Han Hye-lyoung (C)
<li value=10>Park Mi-hyun
<li value=11>Kim Jong-eun
<li value=13>Cheon Eun-bi
<li value=16>Cho Hye-jin
<li value=18>Kim Bo-mi
<li value=20>Kim Hyun-ji
<li value=21>Hong Yoo-jin
<li value=22>Jang Hee-sun
<li value=23>Lee Young-sil
<li value=25>Park Ki-ju
<li value=26>Baek Ee-seul

Reserves:
 Jung Hea-bin (GK)
 Lee Yu-rim

Spain
The following is the Spain roster in the women's field hockey tournament of the 2016 Summer Olympics.

Head coach: Adrian Lock

<li value=1>María López (GK)
<li value=2>Rocío Gutiérrez
<li value=3>Rocío Ybarra (C)
<li value=7>Carlota Petchamé
<li value=8>Carola Salvatella
<li value=9>María López
<li value=10>Berta Bonastre
<li value=11>Cristina Guinea
<li value=17>Lola Riera
<li value=20>Xantal Giné
<li value=21>Beatriz Pérez
<li value=22>Gloria Comerma
<li value=23>Georgina Oliva
<li value=24>Begoña García
<li value=25>Alicia Magaz
<li value=29>Lucía Jiménez Vicente

Reserves:
 Júlia Pons
 María Ángeles Ruiz

Pool B

Argentina
The following is the Argentina roster in the women's field hockey tournament of the 2016 Summer Olympics.

Head coach: Gabriel Minadeo

Reserves:
 Paula Ortiz
 Pilar Romang

Australia
The following is the Australia roster in the women's field hockey tournament of the 2016 Summer Olympics.

Head coach: Adam Commens

<li value=1>Gabrielle Nance
<li value=3>Brooke Peris
<li value=4>Casey Sablowski
<li value=6>Kirstin Dwyer
<li value=7>Jodie Kenny
<li value=11>Karri McMahon
<li value=12>Madonna Blyth (C)
<li value=13>Edwina Bone
<li value=17>Georgina Morgan
<li value=18>Jane Claxton
<li value=19>Georgie Parker
<li value=20>Kathryn Slattery
<li value=24>Mariah Williams
<li value=26>Emily Smith
<li value=27>Rachael Lynch (GK)
<li value=30>Grace Stewart

Reserves:
 TBD
 TBD

Great Britain
The following is the Great Britain roster in the women's field hockey tournament of the 2016 Summer Olympics.

Head coach: Danny Kerry

India
The following is the Indian roster in the women's field hockey tournament of the 2016 Summer Olympics.

Head coach: Neil Hawgood

<li value=1>Navjot Kaur
<li value=3>Deep Grace Ekka
<li value=4>Monika Malik
<li value=8>Nikki Pradhan
<li value=10>Anuradha Devi
<li value=11>Savita Punia (GK)
<li value=15>Poonam Rani
<li value=16>Vandana Kataria
<li value=17>Deepika Thakur
<li value=19>Namita Toppo
<li value=24>Renuka Yadav
<li value=26>Sunita Lakra
<li value=27>Sushila Chanu (C)
<li value=28>Rani Rampal
<li value=30>Preeti Dubey
<li value=31>Lilima Minz

Reserves:
Rajani Etimarpu

Japan
The following is the Japan roster in the women's field hockey tournament of the 2016 Summer Olympics.

Head coach: Yuji Nagai

<li value=1>Sakiyo Asano (GK)
<li value=2>Nagisa Hayashi
<li value=5>Miyuki Nakagawa (C)
<li value=6>Maki Sakaguchi
<li value=7>Aki Mitsuhashi
<li value=8>Ayaka Nishimura
<li value=9>Yuri Nagai
<li value=10>Mie Nakashima
<li value=11>Akane Shibata
<li value=13>Yukari Mano
<li value=14>Emi Nishikori
<li value=16>Mayumi Ono
<li value=22>Motomi Kawamura
<li value=30>Minami Shimizu
<li value=31>Hazuki Nagai
<li value=32>Hazuki Yuda

Reserves:
 Kano Nomura
 Yu Asai
 Ryoko Oie (GK)

United States
The following is the United States roster in the women's field hockey tournament of the 2016 Summer Olympics.

Head coach: Craig Parnham

[[Stefanie Fee]]
<li value=5>[[Melissa González (field hockey)|Melissa González]]
<li value=7>[[Kelsey Kolojejchick]]
<li value=8>[[Rachel Dawson]]
<li value=9>[[Michelle Vittese]]
<li value=10>[[Jill Witmer]]
<li value=12>[[Julia Reinprecht]]
<li value=14>[[Katie Reinprecht]]
<li value=16>[[Katie O'Donnell]]
<li value=18>[[Michelle Kasold]]
<li value=23>[[Katelyn Falgowski]]
<li value=24>[[Kathleen Sharkey]]
<li value=27>[[Lauren Crandall]]
<li value=28>[[Caitlin Van Snickle]]
<li value=29>[[Alyssa Manley]]
<li value=31>[[Jaclyn Kintzer|Jaclyn Briggs]] [[Goalkeeper (field hockey)|(GK)]]
{{div col end}}

Reserves:
<li value=21>[[Paige Selenski]]
<li value=6>[[Alesha Widdall]] [[Goalkeeper (field hockey)|(GK)]]<section end=USA />

References
{{Reflist}}

{{Field hockey at the Summer Olympics}}
{{Competitors at the 2016 Summer Olympics}}

{{DEFAULTSORT:Field hockey at the 2016 Summer Olympics - Women's team squads}}
[[Category:Field hockey players at the 2016 Summer Olympics| ]]
[[Category:Field hockey at the 2016 Summer Olympics – Women's tournament|Squads]]
[[Category:Women's Olympic field hockey squads|2016]]
[[Category:Lists of competitors at the 2016 Summer Olympics]]